Monseñor Eyzaguirre is an underground metro station of Line 3 of the Santiago Metro network, in Santiago, Chile. It is an underground, between the Irarrázaval and Ñuñoa stations on Line 3. It is located at the intersection of Irarrázaval Avenue with Monseñor Eyzaguirre Street. The station was opened on 22 January 2019 as part of the inaugural section of the line, from Los Libertadores to Fernando Castillo Velasco.

Etymology
Its name comes from the fact that it is located on the side of Calle Monseñor Eyzaguirre in the municipality of Ñuñoa. The street recalls José Ignacio Eyzaguirre Portales, ecclesiastic and Chilean historian, the station's pictogram makes direct reference to Eyzaguirre, presenting characteristic elements of the professions of priest and historian, such as a pen, a cross and a book.

References

External links 
Metro de Santiago website (in Spanish)

Santiago Metro stations
Railway stations opened in 2019
Santiago Metro Line 3